The Soyuz MS (GRAU: 11F732A48) is a revision of the Russian spacecraft series Soyuz first launched in 2016. It is an evolution of the Soyuz TMA-M spacecraft, with modernization mostly concentrated on the communications and navigation subsystems. It is used by Roscosmos for human spaceflight. The Soyuz MS has minimal external changes with respect to the Soyuz TMA-M, mostly limited to antennas and sensors, as well as the thruster placement.

The first launch was Soyuz MS-01 on 7 July 2016, aboard a Soyuz-FG launch vehicle towards the International Space Station (ISS). The trip included a two-day checkout phase for the design before docking with the ISS on 9 July 2016.

Design 

A Soyuz spacecraft consists of three parts (from front to back):
 A spheroid orbital module,
 A small aerodynamic reentry module,
 A cylindrical service module with solar panels attached.

The first two portions are habitable living space. By moving as much as possible into the orbital module, which does not have to be shielded or decelerated during re-entry, the Soyuz three-part craft is both larger and lighter than the two-part Apollo spacecraft's command module. The Apollo command module had six cubic meters of living space and a mass of 5000 kg; the three-part Soyuz provided the same crew with nine cubic meters of living space, an airlock, and a service module for the mass of the Apollo capsule alone. This does not take into consideration the orbital module that could be used in place of the LM in Apollo.

Soyuz can carry up to three cosmonauts and provide life support for them for about 30 person-days. The life support system provides a nitrogen/oxygen atmosphere at sea level partial pressures. The atmosphere is regenerated through KO2 cylinders, which absorb most of the CO2 and water produced by the crew and regenerates the oxygen, and LiOH cylinders which absorb leftover CO2. 
Estimated deliverable payload weight is up to 200 kg and up to 65 kg can be returned.

The vehicle is protected during launch by a nose fairing, which is jettisoned after passing through the atmosphere. It has an automatic docking system. The spacecraft can be operated automatically, or by a pilot independently of ground control.

Orbital Module (BO) 

The forepart of the spacecraft is the orbital module (: бытовой отсек (БО), Bitovoy otsek (BO)) also known as the Habitation section. It houses all the equipment that is not needed for reentry, such as experiments, cameras or cargo. Commonly, it is used as both eating area and lavatory. At its far end, it also contains the docking port. This module also contains a toilet, docking avionics and communications gear. On the latest Soyuz versions, a small window was introduced, providing the crew with a forward view.

A hatch between it and the descent module can be closed so as to isolate it to act as an airlock if needed with cosmonauts exiting through its side port (at the bottom of this picture, near the descent module). On the launch pad, cosmonauts enter the spacecraft through this port.

This separation also lets the orbital module be customized to the mission with less risk to the life-critical descent module. The convention of orientation in zero gravity differs from that of the descent module, as cosmonauts stand or sit with their heads to the docking port.

Reentry Module (SA) 

The reentry module (: спускаемый аппарат (СА), Spuskaemiy apparat (SA)) is used for launch and the journey back to Earth. It is covered by a heat-resistant covering to protect it during re-entry. It is slowed initially by the atmosphere, then by a braking parachute, followed by the main parachute which slows the craft for landing. At one meter above the ground, solid-fuel braking engines mounted behind the heat shield are fired to give a soft landing. One of the design requirements for the reentry module was for it to have the highest possible volumetric efficiency (internal volume divided by hull area). The best shape for this is a sphere, but such a shape can provide no lift, which results in a purely ballistic reentry. Ballistic reentries are hard on the occupants due to high deceleration and can't be steered beyond their initial deorbit burn. That is why it was decided to go with the "headlight" shape that the Soyuz uses — a hemispherical forward area joined by a barely angled conical section (seven degrees) to a classic spherical section heat shield. This shape allows a small amount of lift to be generated due to the unequal weight distribution. The nickname was coined at a time when nearly every automobile headlight was a circular paraboloid.

Service Module (PAO) 

At the back of the vehicle is the service module (: приборно-агрегатный отсек (ПАО), Priborno-Agregatniy Otsek (PAO)). It has an instrumentation compartment (: приборный отсек (ПО), Priborniy Otsek (PO)), a pressurized container shaped like a bulging can that contains systems for temperature control, electric power supply, long-range radio communications, radio telemetry, and instruments for orientation and control. The propulsion compartment (: агрегатный отсек (АО), Agregatniy Otsek (AO)), a non-pressurized part of the service module, contains the main engine and a spare: liquid-fuel propulsion systems for maneuvering in orbit and initiating the descent back to Earth. The spacecraft also has a system of low-thrust engines for orientation, attached to the intermediate compartment (: переходной отсек (ПхО), Perekhodnoi Otsek (PkhO)). Outside the service module are the sensors for the orientation system and the solar array, which is oriented towards the sun by rotating the spacecraft.

Re-entry procedure 
Because its modular construction differs from that of previous designs, the Soyuz has an unusual sequence of events prior to re-entry. The spacecraft is turned engine-forward and the main engine is fired for de-orbiting fully 180° ahead of its planned landing site. This requires the least propellant for re-entry, the spacecraft traveling on an elliptical Hohmann orbit to a point where it will be low enough in the atmosphere to re-enter.

Early Soyuz spacecraft would then have the service and orbital modules detach simultaneously. As they are connected by tubing and electrical cables to the descent module, this would aid in their separation and avoid having the descent module alter its orientation. Later Soyuz spacecraft detach the orbital module before firing the main engine, which saves even more propellant, enabling the descent module to return more payload. In no case can the orbital module remain in orbit as an addition to a space station, for the hatch enabling it to function as an airlock is part of the descent module.

Re-entry firing is typically done on the "dawn" side of the Earth, so that the spacecraft can be seen by recovery helicopters as it descends in the evening twilight, illuminated by the sun when it is above the shadow of the Earth. Since the beginning of Soyuz missions to the ISS, only five have performed nighttime landings.

Soyuz MS improvements 
The Soyuz MS received the following upgrades with respect to the Soyuz TMA-M:

 A fifth battery with 155 amp-hour capacity known as 906V was added to support the increased energy consumption from the improved electronics.
 Additional micro-meteoroid protective layer was added to the BO orbital module.
 The new computer (TsVM-101), weighs one-eighth that of its predecessor (8.3 kg versus 70 kg) while also being much smaller than the previous Argon-16 computer.
 While  it is not known whether the propulsion system is still called KTDU-80, it has been significantly modified. While previously the system had 16 high thrust DPO-B and six low thrust DPO-M in one propellant supply circuit, and six other low thrust DPO-M on a different circuit, now all 28 thrusters are high thrust DPO-B, arranged in 14 pairs. Each propellant supply circuit handles 14 DPO-B, with each element of each thruster pair being fed by a different circuit. This provides full fault tolerance for thruster or propellant circuit failure. The new arrangement adds fault tolerance for docking and undocking with one failed thruster or de-orbit with two failed thrusters. Also, the number of DPO-B in the aft section has been doubled to eight, improving the de-orbit fault tolerance.
 The propellant consumption signal, EFIR was redesigned to avoid false positives on propellant consumption.
 The avionics unit, BA DPO, had to be modified for changes in the RCS.
 Instead of relying on ground stations for orbital determination and correction, the now-included Satellite Navigation System ASN-K relies on GLONASS and GPS signals for navigation.
 The old radio command system, the BRTS that relied on the Kvant-V was replaced with an integrated communications and telemetry system, EKTS. It can use not only the Very high frequency (VHF) and Ultra high frequency (UHF) ground stations but, thanks to the addition of an S-band antenna, the Luch Constellation as well, to have theoretical 85% of real time connection to ground control. But since the S-band antenna is fixed and Soyuz spacecraft cruises in a slow longitudinal rotation, in practice this capability might be limited due to lack of antenna pointing capability. It may also be able to use the American TDRS and the European EDRS in the future.
 The old information and telemetry system, MBITS, has been fully integrated into the EKTS.
 The old VHF radio communication system Rassvet-M was replaced with the Rassvet-3BM system that has been integrated into the EKTS.
 The old 38G6 antennas are replaced with four omnidirectional antennas (two on the solar panels tips and two in the PAO) plus one S-band phased array, also in the PAO.
 The descent module communication and telemetry system also received upgrades that will eventually lead to having a voice channel in addition to the present telemetry.
 The EKTS system also includes a COSPAS-SARSAT transponder to transmit its coordinates to ground control in real time during parachute fall and landing.
 All the changes introduced with the EKTS enable the Soyuz to use the same ground segment terminals as the Russian Segment of the ISS.
 The new Kurs-NA automatic docking system is now made indigenously in Russia. Developed by Sergei Medvedev of AO NII TP, it is claimed to be  lighter, 30% less voluminous and use 25% less power. An AO-753A phased array antenna replaced the 2AO-VKA antenna and three AKR-VKA antennas, while the two 2ASF-M-VKA antenna were moved to fixed positions further back.
 The docking system received a backup electric driving mechanism.
 Instead of the analog TV system Klest-M, the spacecraft uses a digital TV system based on MPEG-2, which makes it possible to maintain communications between the spacecraft and the station via a space-to-space RF link and reduces interferences.
 A new Digital Backup Loop Control Unit, BURK, developed by RSC Energia, replaced the old avionics, the Motion and Orientation Control Unit, BUPO and the signal conversion unit BPS.
 The upgrade also replaces the old Rate Sensor Unit BDUS-3M with the new BDUS-3A.
 The old halogen headlights, SMI-4, have been replaced with the LED powered headlight SFOK.
 A new black box SZI-M that records voice and data during the mission was added under the pilot's seat in the descent module. The dual unit module was developed at AO RKS corporation in Moscow with the use of indigenous electronics. It has a capacity of 4 Gb and a recording speed of 256 Kb/s. It can also tolerate  for 30 minutes.

List of flights 

Soyuz MS flights will continue until at least Soyuz MS-23, with regular crew rotation Soyuz flights being reduced from four a year to two a year with the introduction of Commercial Crew (CCP) flights contracted by NASA. Starting from 2021, Roscosmos is marketing the spacecraft for dedicated commercial missions ranging from ~10 days to six months. Currently Roscosmos has three such flights booked, Soyuz MS-20 in 2021 and Soyuz MS-23 in 2022, plus a currently unnumbered flight scheduled for 2023.

References

External links 

 www.russianspaceweb.com – The Soyuz MS spacecraft

Crewed spacecraft
Soyuz program
Vehicles introduced in 2016